Sara Baiyu Porritt, known professionally as Baiyu, is a Chinese-born American singer-songwriter and actress. In the early 1990s, her family moved to Gaithersburg, Maryland where she was then given the American name of "Sara".  Baiyu has appeared in several independent films and was a VJ for the mtvU show "The Freshmen" from 2006 to 2008. She completed high school in three years' time, and later graduated from Princeton University in 2008 with a degree in Sociology.

Early life
Baiyu was surrounded by music at an early age and grew up in the presence of parents who were both musicians themselves.  She resided in Xiamen, Fujian until the age of 8 and reunited with her parents in the United States after having lived with her grandparents for 2 years as her mother and father paved the way for their new life. Baiyu attended Quince Orchard High School where she was a member of the Track and Field team as well as a dedicated member of the school choir.  She took both the second semester of Junior year, as well as the second semester of Senior year off to pursue a career in music.

College years
While attending Princeton, Baiyu traveled to New York City in between classes and schoolwork to develop her musical talents as well as to be a VJ and host for mtvU's show The Freshmen. She also used those years to hone her performance skills as a vocalist for the university's jazz ensemble headed up by Anthony Branker, and as a member and co-director of the school's hip hop dance company BAC. She sang at multiple functions and venues around campus and was often seen writing, referencing and recording music late into the night in the school's various common areas. She was a member of Colonial Club.

Music career

2010–11: Career beginnings and B-Side & Fan Fair
Baiyu released her first EP "B-Side" in December 2010. Most of the songs from this project were completed during her 6-month stay in Kauai, Hawaii where she also completed the filming for an independent film, along with a music video for the single "Sweet Misery".  While in the mountains of Kapaa, Baiyu also took this opportunity to record a remix version of Ryan Leslie's song "When We Dance", for which a video was also released and subsequently featured on The Fader, Bossip and the likes.

In 2011, Baiyu decided to donate all profits from her follow-up EP, "Fan Fair" towards Japanese earthquake and tsunami relief. "Fan Fair" generated buzz and her single "Take a Number" featuring Fred the Godson received airplay on Hot 97 along with numerous college radio stations. Her music video for the second single "Together" premiered on MTV Networks' Logo TV in August 2011. Subsequently, the video also got picked up by MTV UK, MTV Latin America, MTV Canada, MTV España, MTV Brasil, and VH1 Latin America among other television stations.  She was since then been featured in Celebuzz, GlobalGrind, TheSource, MTVIggy, SoulTrain, and various other blogs and magazines. "Fan Fair" hit over 200,000 downloads via the Frostwire platform.

2012–present: Hunter, CW The Next, and debut album
On June 13, 2012, Baiyu released the first piece of her "Hunter" project from her self launched label "Shredded Music".  This is a 13-song album that is accompanied by an animated short entitled "The Illuminators" for which she is basis of the animated heroine. The album features several up and coming, as well as established artists including Los of Puff Daddy's Bad Boy Records; Rotimi, a singer-songwriter who is known for his role on the show "Boss" from the Starz Network; Barbadian soul singer Hal Linton; as well as Paul Kim of American Idol.

For the launch of the music portion of "Hunter", Baiyu held a release event at the famed Custo Barcelona flagship store in SOHO. The music video for her first single from the album is a tune entitled "Invisible" featuring Rotimi, which garnered over 6 million views on WorldStarHipHop and is on regular rotation on Canada's MuchMusic television station. Upon release of the video, Vibe coined Baiyu as "an industry one-to-watch, Baiyu is on the verge of stardom." Shortly after the release of the album, MTV Buzzworthy crowned Baiyu's track "Journey of Souls" one of its "Top 5 Must-Hear Pop Songs of the Week" paying her a "major compliment". The album was produced primarily by KQuick of Grand Staff LLC, who is known for his work with artists such as Ryan Leslie, Chris Brown, Fabolous, and Mýa.

Baiyu became an official brand ambassador for Sprayground in July 2012, a line of backpacks and accessories that have become a closet staple for the likes of Chris Brown, 50 Cent, Justin Bieber, Ziggy Marley, and others.  She is seen on Sprayground's homepage and in their Summer 2012 lookbook.

Having been chosen as one of the top four talents in New York City who are on the "verge of stardom", Baiyu was highlighted on the CW Network show "The Next" by executive producer Queen Latifah.  Within the premise of the program, Baiyu was mentored by famed, Grammy-winning hip hop artist Nelly who spend 72 hours with Baiyu by immersing himself in her life and story in preparation for her New York performance at The Paramount.  The show premiered on August 16, 2012.

At the onset of 2013, Baiyu earned the prestige of being named as one of Yahoo News' "Top 10 Musicians to Watch for 2013". Along with that title, she was also coined one of UNSound Magazine's "13 Artists to Watch in 2013". As a public figure often in the limelight, Baiyu took a divergent approach in 2013 where she is staying behind a veil of mystic. Releasing a new single on the first of every month starting 1/1/13, she moved away from album covers that showcase her image and opted instead for artwork as a representation for her music.  This is believed to be in an effort to encourage listeners to focus on her voice and message, instead of making assumptions based on her looks and heritage.

In July/August 2013, Baiyu collaborated with Eckō Unltd. Canada as the soundtrack and model for one of their largest campaigns, while in September of that year, she also teamed up with Complex (magazine) on their #oneofakindstyle campaign with Dr Pepper. It is rumored that on 12/1/13, after a year of single releases, Baiyu will be dropping a full-length album that is yet to be titled.

Her latest full-length album Ayahuasca takes her fans even deeper into a journey of introspection as she chronicles her experience with the sacred brew.

Charity and Non Profit
From the start of Baiyu's career, she has been dedicated to non-profit work in an effort to give back to not only her local community but communities at large.  Outside of donating the proceeds of "Fan Fair" to the Japanese Red Cross to aid in the tsunami relief efforts, Baiyu became a voice and beacon for DonorsChoose, working with its board of directors to raise funds for music programs in schools throughout various high poverty neighborhoods. Baiyu has also dedicated her time to performances that benefit both kids – via the Sneakers for Scholars program and Camp Good Grief, as well as the homeless – via the Gala for the Homeless event.  She is also a volunteer for New York Cares, and has been honored by Well Done! NYC as an outstanding individual who has "given back to various communities of New York City" as presented by the offices of Senator Chuck Schumer.

Podcast and Recent Career
In August 2019, Baiyu launched a podcast called Hear Us Roar featuring inspired conversations with fearless Asian women about how ideas and passions can ignite transformative journeys. She currently leads Diversity and Inclusion for OMD USA.

Filmography

Television Appearances: As Self
 2012: CW's "The Next"
 2011: MYX TV's "MYX TV Top 10"
 2006–2008: mtvU's "The Freshmen"

Film: Actress
 2012: "The Illuminators: Division"
 2012: "The Chronicles of Elijah Sincere"
 2012: "You're Nobody 'til Somebody Kills You"
 2011: "Queen of Media"

Film: Producer
 2012: "The Illuminators: Division"

Discography

Full studio albums

Extended plays

References

External links

1983 births
Living people
21st-century American actresses
21st-century American women singers
Actresses from Fujian
Actresses from Maryland
American actresses of Chinese descent
American contemporary R&B singers
American film actresses
American film producers
American musicians of Chinese descent
American women film producers
American women pop singers
American women record producers
American women singer-songwriters
Musicians from Fujian
People's Republic of China emigrants to the United States
People's Republic of China musicians
People from Gaithersburg, Maryland
People from Xiamen
Princeton University alumni
Record producers from Maryland
Singers from Fujian
Singer-songwriters from Maryland